Edmund Pery may refer to:
 Edmund Pery, 1st Viscount Pery, Irish politician
 Edmund Pery, 1st Earl of Limerick, Irish peer and politician
 Edmund Pery, 5th Earl of Limerick, British peer and soldier
 Edmund Pery, 7th Earl of Limerick, Anglo-Irish peer